HIPRA is a biotech pharmaceutical company focused on prevention for animal and human health, with a wide range of highly innovative vaccines and an advanced diagnostic service. With its headquarters in Catalonia, it is the world's fifth largest manufacturer of veterinary vaccines and patent leader in the 2010s.

HIPRA has a strong international presence in more than 40 countries with its own subsidiaries, 3 R&D centres and production plants strategically located in Europe (Spain) and America (Brazil).

In addition, its extensive international distribution network maintains open distribution channels with more than 100 countries, covering all 5 continents.

Since 2020, the company has been developing a vaccine against COVID-19.

History 
The beginnings date back to 1971 when a group of young entrepreneurs acquired a small laboratory in Madrid founded in 1954, called HIPRA (by the surnames of its former creators: Hidalgo and Prada), and moved to Amer (Girona).

The year 1991, with a workforce of 100 people and a turnover of 10 million euros, was a crucial year in HIPRA's history. A new highly motivated management team redefines the company's expansion policy. Thus begins an important period of technical and commercial expansion.

As of the year 2000, began the internationalization of HIPRA with the implementation of our own subsidiaries around the world. Currently HIPRA has commercial subsidiaries in 40 countries, 3 research centers and 6 production plants strategically located in Europe and America. Its extensive distribution network covers the 5 continents.

In 2009 the strategic positioning was refined with the clear mission of being the world leader in prevention, with differential and innovative products and, therefore, it stopped investing in pharmacological products.

In 2020, and in a context of the Covid-19 pandemic, a new challenge was faced using its extensive experience in innovative vaccines, the development of the vaccine against this new virus based on recombinant protein.

In 2021 the new Human Health division was created to develop new innovative products. The same year GoodGut was acquired, a biotechnological start-up dedicated to the research and development of diagnostic tests for digestive diseases.

Animal health 
HIPRA has developed more than 100 vaccines for different animal species, both production and companion animals, against a wide variety of biological targets. In addition to its Amer plant, the company has another plant in Brazil, in the Porto Alegre conurbation. It also has a university research centre in the United States.

HIPRA's animal health products include vaccines, vaccination devices, integrated traceability services and state-of-the-art diagnostic kits.

External links 
 hipra.com, company website

References

Biotechnology companies of Spain
Pharmaceutical companies of Spain
Vaccination-related organizations